2face may refer to:
2face Idibia, Nigerian musician
Two-Face, DC Comics supervillain
"2Face" (song), a song by Beni